The Bambini-Code was a brevity code used for tactical radio voice communications by the Swiss Air Force (SAF). It was developed by the SAF during World War II and was used until 1998. It is sometimes referred to as the "fifth national language" of Switzerland.

History
The code was developed from the need to communicate via poor-quality radio links in the noisy environment of the aircraft then in service with the SAF. It was used by the SAF from around the start of the Second World War until 1998.

As the SAF started to have regular communications with foreign air forces in Switzerland and abroad, the Bambini-Code was no longer suitable. For example, with the retirement of the Hawker Hunter from SAF service in 1994, SAF pilots in the United States learning to fly its replacement the McDonnell Douglas F/A-18 Hornet found they could not be understood when using the Bambini-code. So in 1998 the SAF changed to the NATO standard multiservice tactical brevity code. This was also at the time the SAF switched from using the metric system of measurement to the Imperial units of feet and miles per hour, although it kept the use of litres rather than gallons as the measurement unit for fuel. The NATO Brevity Code is now the standard code for the SAF at any time.

Code words
The Bambini-code comprised a vocabulary of about 500 words.

The code words were chosen so that they were phonetically as clear and distinct as possible. Vowel-rich words meet this requirement best and Italian words tend to have this characteristic, so many of the codewords sound Italian. For example, "Bambini" is the Italian for "Children".

Examples of code words
Some of the words are given below with their meanings in English.

Addio = Dispersal, disengagement
ALA = Flaps
Alarme = Alarm
Altezza = Altitude above sea level in hectometers
Alto = Top, high
Angeli = Friendly aircraft (Angeli is Swiss German for little angel)
Atlanta = West
Attaco ident numero = Tactical attack to read the aircraft Serial No.
Attaco ident Timonella = Tactical attack to force an aircraft to land
Attaco Siwa = Attack with Sidewinder missile
Attendez = Wait
Attendez campo = Wait on the airfield
Avanti = Start attack, attack curve
Aviso = Message, information
Bambini = All our aircraft
Basso = Below
Bello = Friendly aircraft are safe
Bibi = Fighter
Bingo = Fuel remaining on reserve
Camille = Fuel at 1000 lbs / l
Campari = Fuel (Campari is an Italian apéritif).
Campo = Airfield, base
Capito = Understood
Carello = Landing gear (caRrello is Italian both for shopping trolley and landing gear)
Casino = Home base
Clearance = Release, authorization
Colonna = Column
Color = Landing lights
Condor = Unidentified aircraft
Conditione = Weather conditions
Corso = Compascurs
Demitour = Reverse curve
Descenze = Descent
Diaboli = Enemy aircraft
Domanda = Request
Finale = Final approach
Finito = End of the radio traffic, closed end
Formazione grande = Wide formation
Formazione picco = Close formation
Gardez = Watch it, watch
Inferno = Rain
In posizione = In position
In siesta = In peace
Lago = Lake, water
Libero = Not used, free
Lili = Left
Lilitour = Turn 90° left
Mekka = East 
Meteo = Weather
Montare Pece = Maximum afterburner climb
Montare sec = Climb at full throttle
Nase = straight ahead (Nase is German for nose)
Nobis = No
Nobis capitonnage = Not understood
Norwega = North
Partenza = Start, departure
Pece = Afterburner
Piano = Slow, slower
Piccolo = Little, small
Positione = Location
 = Probably
Positione = Partenza location
Pressione = Speed
Presto = Fast, faster
Pronto = Ready
Rendezvous = Meeting time
Repetez = Repeat the message
Rera = Right
Reratour = Turn 90° right
Reravolte = right turn
Riposo = Land
Riposo direkt = Direct approach
Risponde = Reply
Ritorno = Return 
Sec = Full throttle
Silencium = Radio silence 
Siwa = AIM-9 Sidewinder missile
Sopra = Over
Stabilo = Back
Stuka = Dive brakes ("Stuka" is an abbreviation of Sturzkampfflugzeug, the German term for a dive bomber)
Subito = Immediately
Sudan = South
Timo Ella = Call for landing
Tiralto = Pull command
Touchez Repartenza = Touch-and-go landing
Vista = View, sight

References

Citations

Bibliography

External links
Bambini-code in use between a Dassault Mirage III and a TFC on the Florida Radar System at 5:35 on YouTube 

Swiss Air Force
Military history of Switzerland
Brevity codes